Tales to Warm Your Mind is a 1969 album by the music group The Irish Rovers. The album title comes from a line in the song "Stop, Look, Listen."

Track listing 
Side 1
"Stop, Look, Listen" (Stuart Harrison) - 2:09
"The Stolen Child" (Arranged and adapted by Will Millar) - 2:25
"Penny Whistle Peddler" (George Millar, Will Millar) - 2:25
"The Village of Brambleshire Wood" (George Millar, Will Millar) - 2:50
"Oh You Mucky Kid" (Stan Kelly) - 2:38
"Lily the Pink" (John Gorman, Mike McGear, Roger McGough) - 3:21
Side 2
"Mrs. Crandall's Boardinghouse" (George Millar, Will Millar, Wilcil McDowell) - 2:43
"Our Little Boy Blue" (based on "The Eugene Field Poem" by Eugene Field; words: Will Millar) - 3:10
"The Minstrel of Cranberry Lane" (Judy Callahan, Mike Callahan) - 2:17
"Ally-Bally" (Arranged and adapted by Will Millar) - 2:28
"Pigs Can't Fly" (Will Millar) - 1:53

External links
Tales to Warm Your Mind: the Irish Rovers at the Balladeers
The Irish Rovers Official Website

The Irish Rovers albums
1969 albums
Albums produced by Milt Okun
Decca Records albums